Ice Age Fossils State Park is a 315-acre state park in North Las Vegas, Nevada, United States, on the northernmost fringe of the metropolitan area. It is located adjacent to the Tule Springs Fossil Beds National Monument near Willie McCool Regional Park. 
This park is currently under construction and there are no facilities available to the public yet. Grand opening information will be posted to the park website and social media once a date has been determined.

History
Ice Age Fossils State Park was announced in January 2017 as part of Governor Brian Sandoval's $15 million "Explore Your Nevada" initiative. The grand opening of the visitor center and overall completion of the park will be sometime in 2023.
The park originally was to be named Tule Springs State Park, but was named Ice Age Fossils State Park to avoid confusion with the Tule Springs Fossil Beds National Monument.

The park is located on land that was wetlands during the last Ice Age of Prehistoric Nevada between roughly 100,000 to 11,700 years ago. It is the site of excavations of fossils from animals that called this area home, such as Columbian mammoths, American lions, dire wolves, saber-toothed cats, ancient bison, camels, ground sloths, horses, and llamas. These animals and more have been found during the 1962–1963 "Big Dig" excavation and over the 120 year history of scientific exploration in the area.

Activities and amenities
Ice Age Fossils State Park features a network of trails leading to fossil beds and archaeological sites. A visitor center with a small museum will open in 2023. Camping and off-roading within the park is prohibited.

Vegetation
Rare bear poppies among other endemic plant species can be found within the park.

References

Parks in Nevada
Parks in Clark County, Nevada
State parks of Nevada
Paleontology in Nevada